This article lists events that occurred during 1935 in Estonia.

Incumbents

Events
 Patriotic League is founded.
 Estonian Maritime Museum is founded.

Births
19 January – Fred Jüssi, Estonian biologist, nature writer and photographer
11 September – Arvo Pärt, Estonian composer

Deaths

References

 
1930s in Estonia
Estonia
Estonia
Years of the 20th century in Estonia